Siborne is a surname. Notable people with the surname include: 

Herbert Taylor Siborne (1826–1902), British Army officer in the Royal Engineers and military historian
William Siborne (1797–1849), British officer and military historian, father of Herbert